Jan Karlsson (4 December 1940 – 16 April 2019)) is a Swedish former footballer. He played for Jönköpings Södra IF, Djurgårdens IF and IFÖ Bromölla IF. Karlsson made 28 appearances for Sweden national football team and scored 1 goal.

Honours

Club 
 Djurgårdens IF 
 Allsvenskan: 1964

References

Swedish footballers
Sweden international footballers
Allsvenskan players
Jönköpings Södra IF players
Djurgårdens IF Fotboll players
1940 births
2019 deaths
Association football defenders